Albertus Frederik Johannes Klijn (17 April 1923 – 30 May 2012) was a Dutch scholar of the New Testament and early Judaism and Christianity at the Rijksuniversiteit Groningen. He was best known for his introductory work on the New Testament, and then later for his publications on early Christian apocryphal literature.

Klijn studied theology at Rijksuniversiteit Utrecht, and submitted his doctoral dissertation in 1949 on the "Western" Text of the Gospels and Acts. In 1951 he became a Reformed pastor in Heinkenszand, Zeeland. Four years later he began teaching, returning to the University of Utrecht as a lecturer. In 1967 Klijn was appointed professor of early Christian literature and interpretation of the New Testament at the Rijksuniversiteit Groningen. It was at Groningen that he began to specialize in second-temple Jewish pseudepigrapha and in early Christian literature. Klijn was the editor of the series "De prediking van het Nieuwe Testament: Een theologische commentaar", to which he himself contributed volumes on the Pastoral Epistles (1994), the Epistle to the Hebrews (1975) and the Epistle to the Philippians (1974). Klijn retired from Groningen in 1986.

Select works

Thesis

Books
 
 
 
 
 
 
  - English translation of De wordingsgeschiedenis van het Nieuwe Testament

Articles & Chapters

Festschriften
 Tjitze Baarda (ed.), Text and Testimony: Essays on New Testament and Apocryphal Literature in Honour of A. F. J. Klijn (Kampen 1988)

References

External links
"Prof. A. F. J. Klijn overleden", Reformatorisch Dagblad, 1 June 2012
"Hoogleraar Klijn overleden", Omroep Groningen, 1 June 2012

1923 births
2012 deaths
Dutch biblical scholars
Dutch historians of religion
New Testament scholars
People from Doorn
Academic staff of the University of Groningen
Utrecht University alumni